The Manifold Way is a footpath and cycle way in Staffordshire, England. Some  in length, it runs from Hulme End  in the north to Waterhouses  in the south, mostly through the Manifold Valley and the valley of its only tributary, the River Hamps, following the route of the former Leek and Manifold Valley Light Railway, a  gauge line which closed in 1934 after a short life.

The Manifold Way was opened in July 1937 by Staffordshire County Council after the LMS handed over the trackbed to them. Tarmacked throughout, and with only a slight downhill gradient from north to south, the path is also ideal for wheelchair users, prams, etc. This section includes Swainsley Tunnel. However, the signed Manifold Trail is routed along the eastern bank of the river and largely avoids the on-road route.

Unlike other nearby walk- and cycleways, such as the Tissington Trail and the High Peak Trail, which cross elevated areas of the Peak District, the Manifold Way follows the valley bottoms and is altogether more sheltered. The path passes through attractive scenery, and indeed tourism was one of the reasons for the original construction of the line. Popular locations along the route include Thor's Cave, the mill at Wetton Hill and Beeston Tor. A little to the east lies Dovedale, a better-known beauty spot.

The Manifold Way does not pass through any significant centres of population; indeed it was once described by a railway worker as a line that started in the middle of nowhere, and ended up in the same place.  Whilst the railway did serve villages and hamlets along its route, these were mostly located about a mile above the valley, a fact which contributed to the railway's ultimate demise.

Whilst walking along the Manifold Way the rivers Manifold and Hamps are never far away - in fact there are dozens of small bridges crossing them. However, over the summer months the River Manifold disappears down a swallet or sink hole near Wetton Mill, to reappear some distance way, at Ilam.

In all there were ten stations and halts along the line. Most had some sort of waiting room, and also a siding, but were only small affairs. The sites of the halts can be seen today, and there is also some evidence of the loading platforms, especially at Ecton, where the dairy provided much business for the railway.

The valley-bottom nature of the Manifold Way offers much to see in the way of flora and fauna, and animal wildlife. Apart from the official Manifold Way route itself, the area also lends itself to many circular walking routes which utilize the route.

The Manifold Way passes through some areas which comprise the South Peak Estate, land holdings owned by the National Trust.

At Hulme End, the old station building has been restored as a visitor centre, and the cafe/shop at Wetton Mill is a popular spot. At Ecton Hill lie the remains of a 4,000-year-old copper mine, and the caves at Beeston Tor have revealed Neolithic and Bronze Age remains.

The trackway is well maintained and there are a number of car parks and refreshment facilities (some mobile) situated at convenient intervals along its length.

There are campsites at Hulme End and Wetton Village, and bikes can be hired at Waterhouses, at the southern end of the trail.

References

External links
 A selection of walks using the Manifold Way

Cycleways in England
Peak District
Rail trails in England
Footpaths in Staffordshire
1937 establishments in England
Tourist attractions of the Peak District